The following is the final results of the Iran Super League 2004/05 basketball season. After passing a season of hard work for all participating teams, the 2004-05 Iranian Super League came to its end, crowning Sanam as the Champions of Iran. Sanam thrashed its arch-rival, Saba Battery, 94-79 in the final match. This difference seemed to give a real shock to Saba, which came to this game, almost as an unbeatable team during the whole season. Even Andre Pitts and Lorenzo Hall could not help Saba to survive from the quagmire made by Sanam. In the first game, Saba beat Sanam 79-75.

Regular season

Group A

Group B

Playoffs

Championship

1st round

Quarterfinals

Semifinals

3rd place match

Final

Classifications

Relegation matches

Final ranking

 Sanam and Saba Battery qualified to 2005 WASL League.
 Dokhaniat, Galin Macaron, Shahid Ghandi and Mahram relegated to Division 1.

References
 Asia-Basket

Iranian Basketball Super League seasons
League
Iran